Trịnh Công Luận (born 6 January 1972) is a Vietnamese male paralympic discus thrower.

References

External links
IPC Profile
London 2012 Profile "Cong Luan Trinh" 

1972 births
Living people
Paralympic competitors for Vietnam
Athletes (track and field) at the 2012 Summer Paralympics
Vietnamese discus throwers
Medalists at the 2010 Asian Para Games
21st-century Vietnamese people